As a solo artist, English singer Boy George has released nine studio albums, five compilation albums and forty-eight singles. The vocalist has also released seven DJ albums, three EPs and a soundtrack album.

Boy George was born as George Alan O'Dowd on 14 June 1961 in Bexley, London, England. The singer was essentially part of the English New Romantic movement which emerged in the early 1980s. He helped give androgyny an international stage with the success of Culture Club during the 1980s. His music is often classified as blue-eyed soul, influenced by rhythm and blues and reggae. Between 1989 and 1992, he also founded and was lead singer of Jesus Loves You, which performed house and dance music. In the 1990s and 2000s, Boy George's solo music reveals also glam rock influences such as David Bowie and Iggy Pop. Being involved in many activities (among them songwriting, DJing, writing books, designing clothes and photography), he has released fewer music recordings in the 21st century.

Albums

Studio albums

Compilation albums

DJ albums
 1999: Galaxy Mix
 2001: Essential Mix
 2001: BoyGeorgeDj.com
 2001: Lucky for Some
 2002: Something Old, Something New – A More Protein Compilation
 2002: A Night Out with Boy George – A DJ Mix
 2002: A Night In with Boy George – A Chillout Mix

Soundtracks
 2002: Taboo - Original London Cast

EPs

Singles

Solo singles

As featured artist

References

External links
 Boy George on AllMusic
 Boy George on Discogs
 Boy George on Rate Your Music

Discographies of British artists
Pop music discographies